Platyptilia gentiliae is a moth of the family Pterophoridae. It is known from Argentina and Chile.

The wingspan is about 17 mm. Adults are on wing in October and January.

External links

gentiliae
Moths described in 1991
Taxa named by Cees Gielis